This is a list of candidates of the 1912 South Australian state election.

Retiring MPs

Labor

 Alfred Edwin Winter (Wallaroo)

Liberal Union

 John Warren MLC (North Eastern District)

House of Assembly
Sitting members are shown in bold text. Successful candidates are marked with an asterisk.

Legislative Council

Sitting members are shown in bold text. Successful candidates are marked with an asterisk.

Notes

 Confusingly, there were two different candidates by the name of Thomas Ryan at this election. Thomas Ryan, an incumbent MHA for Torrens, contested and lost Alexandra. The unsuccessful independent candidate for Flinders of the same name was a farmer and grazier from Uroonda.

References

1912 elections in Australia
Candidates for South Australian state elections
1910s in South Australia